Non Sombun is the name of several places in Thailand.

Non Sombun subdistrict, Mueang Bueng Kan, Bueng Kan
Non Sombon subdistrict, Na Chaluai, Ubon Ratchathani
Non Sombun subdistrict, Det Udom, Ubon Ratchathani 
Non Sombun subdistrict, Soeng Sang, Nakhon Ratchasima
Non Sombun subdistrict, Ban Haet, Khon Kaen
Non Sombun subdistrict, Khao Suan Kwang, Khon Kaen (also a municipality)
Non Sombun municipality, Soeng Sang, Nakhon Ratchasima, covering parts of the subdistrict